Endophytes are micro-organisms living within the tissue of a plant as endosymbionts, without causing symptoms of disease. Some of them are mutualistic symbionts with beneficial effects on their host, such as improved growth or resistance against disease or environmental stress, and are being used as microbial inoculants. However, pathogens and saprophytes may also be endophytic at some point of their life cycle. Endophytes are distinct from mycorrhizal fungi or rhizosphere microbes in that they live entirely within the plant. Most endophytes known are bacteria or fungi, although there are also some endophytic algae and oomycetes.

This list contains genera with endophytic species (but which may also have non-endophytic species). Species are only listed in notable cases. Where specific variants or cultivars of a species are endophytic, this is detailed on the taxon's page. The host range is "wide" when it does not include only a specific lineage of plants; in that case, the lineage is given.

Bacteria
See also Rhizobia  for the nitrogen-fixing bacteria on roots of legumes (Fabaceae).

Fungi

Algae and oomycetes

See also
List of symbiotic organisms
List of symbiotic relationships
Plant pathology
Plant use of endophytic fungi in defense

Endophytes
Endophytes
Endophytes